= Maria do Rosário Teixeira de Alva Sequeira Bragança Sambo =

Angolan politician

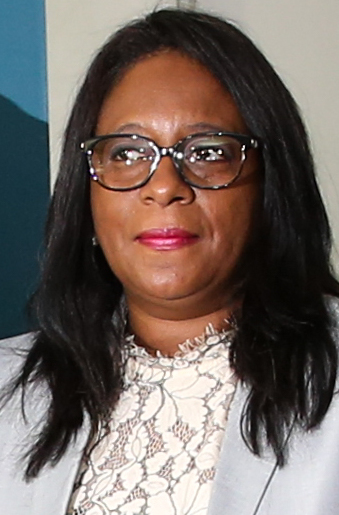
- Born: Angola
- Occupation: Politician

Maria do Rosário Teixeira de Alva Sequeira Bragança Sambo is an Angolan politician. She is the current Minister of Higher Education, Science, Technology and Innovation of Angola, as well as a member of parliament. She is the member of MPLA.
